The 1993 Bulgarian Cup Final was played at the Hristo Botev Stadium in Blagoevgrad on 2 June 1993, and was contested between the sides of CSKA Sofia and Botev Plovdiv. The match was won by CSKA Sofia.

Match

Details

See also
1992–93 A Group

Bulgarian Cup finals
Botev Plovdiv matches
PFC CSKA Sofia matches
Cup Final